The UWN World Championship is a professional wrestling world championship owned by the United Wrestling Network promotion. The title was introduced on October 13, 2020, and the winner of an eight-man tournament being crowned the inaugural champion. On October 2, 2021, Chris Dickinson defeated Mike Bennett on UWN Primetime Live in the finals to become the first champion. The current champion is Danny Limelight, who is in his first reign.

History 
On October 13, 2020, at UWN Primetime Live, David Marquez revealed the UWN World Championship for the first time. Marquez announced a tournament of eight-man to crown the inaugural champion, when the participants of the tournaments would be revealed on the October 20 edition of UWN Primetime Live. The original lineup featured former WWE wrestler Erick Redbeard (formrly Rowan) versus Watts, Chris Dickinson versus AEW wrestler & Championship Wrestling From Arizona founder Peter Avalon, New Japan Pro-Wrestling young lion Karl Fredericks versus former WWE star Fred Rosser (FKA Darren Young), and Mike Bennett versus Davey Boy Smith Jr. However, for unknown reasons, Watts, Fredericks, and Davey Boy pulled from the tournament. Redbeard ended up facing Rosser, Bennett wrestled Kevin Martenson, and a new match was made between Shawn Daivari and Rocky Romero. On November 17, 2020, the UWN announced that the finals of the tournament between Bennett & Dickenson were postponed after Dickenson suffered an injury. The tournament resumed on the October 2, 2021 Primetime Live special, where Dickinson defeated Bennett to become the inaugural chammpion.

Tournament Brackets

Reigns 

References

External links

United Wrestling Network championships
World professional wrestling championships